Charis Pavlidis (born 25 January 1971 in Thessaloniki) is a retired Greek water polo player and the current coach of Olympiacos Women's Water Polo Team, since 2007. Under his guidance, Olympiacos have won two LEN Euro Leagues, two LEN Super Cups, one LEN Trophy and ten Greek Championships.

As a player (a defender), Pavlidis played for Olympiacos from 1991 to 2000, winning numerous titles. He was also a member of Greece men's national water polo team.

References

External links

Categories

1971 births
Living people
Olympiacos Women's Water Polo Team coaches
Olympiacos Water Polo Club players
Greek male water polo players
Greek water polo coaches
Canada women's national water polo team coaches
Water polo players from Thessaloniki